William R. Smith may refer to:
 William Ramsay Smith (1859–1937), Australian anthropologist
 Sir William Reardon Smith (1856–1935), British shipowner
 William R. Smith (Mormon) (1826–1894), Utah territorial politician and religious leader
 William Redwood Smith (1851–1935), Associate Justice of the Kansas Supreme Court
 William Robert Smith (1863–1924), member of the U.S. House of Representatives from Texas (1903–1916)
 William Robertson Smith (1846–1894), philologist, physicist, archaeologist, and Biblical critic
 William Russell Smith (1815–1896), member of the U.S. House of Representatives from Alabama (1851–1856)
 William Rudolph Smith (1787–1868), Attorney General of Wisconsin
 William Ruthven Smith (1868–1941), U.S. army officer and Superintendent of the U.S. Military Academy
 William R. Smith 4-4-0 locomotive, used for a short portion of the 1862 Andrews Railroad Raid

See also
William Smith (disambiguation)